Leela Devi Dookun Luchoomun MP GCSK (born ळीला डेवि डूखुन ळुचूमुन on 16 April 1961) is the former Minister of Social Security of Mauritius serving in the cabinet of Navin Ramgoolam having been appointed on 11 May 2010 by President Anerood Jugnauth. She is Member of Parliament representing Constituency No 8, Moka & Quartier Militaire. She is a former Minister of Arts & Culture serving in the cabinet of Paul Berenger for a short period of 6 months.

She was appointed as Parliamentary Private Secretary in September 2000 after the MSM/MMM coalition won the elections. She firstly served in the cabinet of Sir Anerood Jugnauth. She is a member of the Militant Socialist Movement and is the Vice President of the Party. She is also President of the Women Wing of the same political party. She is along with Nando Bodha and Showkatally Soodhun to form the front bench of the MSM in the Ptr-MSM-PMSD coalition government.

She is a farmer by profession. She is well known for being a highly renowned Primary Teacher in the country. Leela Devi Dookun Luchoomun has a rich political career. In 1996, she joined the Militant Socialist Movement and took part in the municipal elections of Vacoas-Phoenix, then stood as candidate in Constituency No 15, La Caverne & Phoenix in 2000. She was elected and served as 1st Member of parliament for the constituency. In 2005, the MSM/MMM coalition lost to Social Alliance and she was elected 3rd MP for the same constituency but serving in the opposition. She was member of the opposition from 2005 to 2010 before the general elections in 2010.

She holds a BSc Hons from the University of Delhi and completed her Postgraduate Certificate in Education at the MIE and her Postgraduate Diploma in Education (PGDip) from the University of Brighton. She is also a Part-time lecturer at the Mauritius Institute of Education. She is married and is the mother of two children.

On 12 March 2020, Mrs Dookun Luchoomun was elevated to the status of Grand Commander Of The Order of the Star and Key of the Indian Ocean (GCSK) the highest decoration of the country by the President of the Republic of Mauritius His Excellency Mr Prithvirajsing Roopun for distinguished service in politics and education.

Awards and decorations 
 :
  Grand Commander of the Order of the Star and Key of the Indian Ocean (2020)

Best minister of Education of year in Africa 2020/21

References

1961 births
Living people
Government ministers of Mauritius
Culture ministers of Mauritius
Members of the National Assembly (Mauritius)
Militant Socialist Movement politicians
Mauritian politicians of Indian descent